Lincoln County is a county in the U.S. state of Wyoming. As of the 2020 United States Census, the population was 19,581. Its county seat is Kemmerer. Its western border abuts the eastern borders of the states of Idaho and Utah.

History
Lincoln County was created February 21, 1911, with land detached from Uinta County. Its government was organized in 1913.

The county was named for Abraham Lincoln, sixteenth president of the United States.

In 1921, portions of Lincoln County were annexed to create Sublette County and Teton County, leaving Lincoln County with its present borders.

Geography

Adjacent counties

Teton County – north
Sublette County – northeast
Sweetwater County – east
Uinta County – south
Rich County, Utah – southwest
Bear Lake County, Idaho – west
Caribou County, Idaho – northwest
Bonneville County, Idaho – northwest

National protected areas

 Bridger-Teton National Forest (part)
 Caribou-Targhee National Forest (part)
 Cokeville Meadows National Wildlife Refuge
 Fossil Butte National Monument

Demographics

2000 census
As of the 2000 United States Census, there were 14,573 people, 5,266 households, and 3,949 families in the county. The population density was 4 people per square mile (1/km2). There were 6,831 housing units at an average density of 2 per square mile (1/km2). The racial makeup of the county was 97.15% White, 0.10% Black or African American, 0.57% Native American, 0.23% Asian, 0.05% Pacific Islander, 0.71% from other races, and 1.19% from two or more races. 2.16% of the population were Hispanic or Latino of any race. 29.0% were of English, 14.6% German, 9.5% American and 6.1% Irish ancestry.

There were 5,266 households, out of which 36.5% had children under the age of 18 living with them, 66.7% were married couples living together, 5.1% had a female householder with no husband present, and 25.0% were non-families. 21.0% of all households were made up of individuals, and 7.9% had someone living alone who was 65 years of age or older. The average household size was 2.75 and the average family size was 3.23.

The county population contained 30.9% under the age of 18, 7.2% from 18 to 24, 25.4% from 25 to 44, 24.2% from 45 to 64, and 12.4% who were 65 years of age or older. The median age was 37 years. For every 100 females there were 102.0 males. For every 100 females age 18 and over, there were 101.3 males.

The median income for a household in the county was $40,794, and the median income for a family was $44,919. Males had a median income of $37,353 versus $20,928 for females. The per capita income for the county was $17,533. About 6.4% of families and 9.0% of the population were below the poverty line, including 11.6% of those under age 18 and 6.4% of those age 65 or over.

2010 census
As of the 2010 United States Census, there were 18,106 people, 6,861 households, and 4,957 families in the county. The racial makeup of the county was 95.4% white, 0.8% American Indian, 0.3% Asian, 0.2% black or African American, 2.0% from other races, and 1.2% from two or more races. Those of Hispanic or Latino origin made up 4.3% of the population. In terms of ancestry, 25.7% were English, 20.1% were American, 19.2% were German, 7.5% were Irish, and 5.0% were Italian.

Of the 6,861 households, 34.4% had children under the age of 18 living with them, 63.2% were married couples living together, 5.3% had a female householder with no husband present, 27.8% were non-families, and 22.8% of all households were made up of individuals. The average household size was 2.63 and the average family size was 3.11. The median age was 37.4 years.

The median income for a household in the county was $57,794 and the median income for a family was $65,347. Males had a median income of $49,087 versus $30,539 for females. The per capita income for the county was $24,421. About 4.6% of families and 8.1% of the population were below the poverty line, including 14.2% of those under age 18 and 6.2% of those age 65 or over.

2014 American Community Survey
According to the 2014 American Community Survey, the largest ancestries/ethnicities in Lincoln County, Wyoming were:
27.3% were of English ancestry
17.9% were of German ancestry
10.6% were of "American" ancestry
7.5% were of Irish ancestry
4.2% were of Italian ancestry.

Education
There are two school districts in the county, Lincoln County School District Number 1, which includes Kemmerer High School, and Lincoln County School District Number 2, which includes Star Valley High School.

Communities

City
 Kemmerer (county seat)

Towns

 Afton
 Alpine
 Cokeville
 Diamondville
 La Barge
 Opal
 Star Valley Ranch
 Thayne

Census-designated places

 Alpine Northeast
 Alpine Northwest
 Auburn
 Bedford
 Etna
 Fairview
 Fontenelle
 Freedom
 Grover
 Nordic
 Oakley
 Osmond
 Smoot
 Taylor
 Turnerville

Unincorporated communities

 Alpine Junction
 Border Junction
 Frontier
 Hamsfork
 Sage

Politics
Lincoln County voters are reliably Republican. In only one national election since 1948 has the county selected the Democratic Party nominee.

See also
National Register of Historic Places listings in Lincoln County, Wyoming
Wyoming
List of cities and towns in Wyoming
List of counties in Wyoming
Wyoming statistical areas

References

External links

 
1913 establishments in Wyoming
Populated places established in 1913